Botleys Mansion is a Palladian mansion house in the south of Chertsey, Surrey, England, just south of St Peter's Hospital.  The house was built in the 1760s by builders funded by Joseph Mawbey and to designs by Kenton Couse.  The elevated site once bore a 14th-century manor house seized along with all the other manors of Chertsey from Chertsey Abbey, a very rich abbey, under Henry VIII's Dissolution of the Monasteries and today much of its land is owned by two hospitals, one public, one private and the local council authority.  The remaining mansion and the near park surrounding were used for some decades as a colony hospital and as a private care home. The building is owned and used by a wedding venues company.

It is a Grade II* listed building.

History
The building standing today was built c.1765 as a replacement of an old manor. The mansion's ownership was transferred often throughout its history. The site was purchased by Surrey County Council in 1929 and Botley's Colony was established during the 1930s. The plan for the new layout of the new buildings was by the architects J.M. Sheppard & co circa 1935.

The Metropolitan Asylums Board was dissolved in 1930 and responsibility of caring for the mentally deficient was passed to the (local government) Councils. Surrey County Council decided set up new buildings to house patients while the mansion housed the hospital staff becoming designated from 1932 Botley's Park hospital, which specialised in patients with psychiatric disorders. The first section of the new hospital was opened on 24 June 1939 by Lady Henriques, wife of then chairman of the Council Sir Philip Henriques. In September of the same year, many of the hospital's patients were moved to Murray House in nearby Ottershaw so that Botleys could receive wounded soldiers from the war. During this time, the mansion was adapted into a nurses' home.

The mansion was damaged by fire in 1994 and within two years, most of the nurses' home closed down. It was restored by P&O Developments between 1996 and 1997.

Architecture
In architecture it is Grade II* listed, the middle category of listing, which as with the top category (Grade I) applies to less than one third of listed buildings.

It is a Couse stone-built house in simple Palladian architecture without wings, with walls clad in stone and surrounded by park land and iron gates. The stone came from quarries at Headington, Oxfordshire and Barrington, Cambridgeshire.

The house is almost cubic in form, and the estate was about two miles in circumference, today about a mile; and approximately square, thus . A double flight of steps leads to the marble-paved entrance hall of the house. The entrance hall ceiling is supported by Scagliola columns and Ionic pilasters.

Ownership
In 1319, the original Botleys Mansion was either owned by John de Butteley or John Manory of Chertsey. In 1505, de Butteley's son Thomas gave the mansion to Richard Merland, Thomas Pervoche, and Henry Wykes; soon after though, Wykes became the sole owner of the mansion, then called Botlese Mansion. Ownership of the mansion changed hands several times and was owned by King Henry VIII in 1541, after he purchased it from Sir Roger Cholmeley. In 1763, the mansion was transferred to Joseph Mawbey, the man responsible for the house's reconstruction. The mansion was passed around after Mawbey's death until it was purchased by Robert Gosling in 1822. The Gosling family lived in the mansion until 1931, when the Surrey County Council purchased the building for £30,000.

The mansion was bought and restored by a company, Bijou Wedding Venues, in 2010 and is used to host weddings and events.

References
Footnotes

Bibliography

Country houses in Surrey
Palladian architecture
Grade II* listed buildings in Surrey
Lakes of Surrey